Uyanga Boldbaatar, known professionally as Úyanga Bold and Éla Eko or Ella Ekko, is a vocalist from Mongolia, known for her work on cinema and video game soundtracks, including the 2020 film Mulan and Motherland: Fort Salem television series. She studied singing at Berklee College of Music and received a bachelor's degree in Vocal Performance.

References

External links 
 
 
 Reverb Nation - Ella Ekko profile

21st-century Mongolian women singers
Berklee College of Music alumni
Year of birth missing (living people)
Living people